The James Madison–William & Mary football rivalry between the James Madison Dukes and the William & Mary Tribe is a match-up between two public universities, James Madison University and the College of William and Mary, in the state of Virginia as well as members of the Colonial Athletic Association. The football series began in 1978 and has been played a total of 44 times as of 2021.

History
Previously, the game has been a divisional game in the CAA South, and conference game in the Yankee Conference and Atlantic 10 beginning with the Dukes entry in 1993.  During this period, the teams have combined for two national championships (JMU in 2004 and 2016) and eleven conference championships (JMU in 1999, 2004, 2008, 2015, 2016, 2017; W&M in 1996, 2001, 2004, 2010, 2015). All of James Madison's home games have been hosted at Bridgeforth Stadium in Harrisonburg, Virginia while William & Mary has hosted its contests at Zable Stadium in Williamsburg, Virginia; as of 2019, no games have been played on a neutral field.

The most recent game was played on November 13, 2021 with James Madison defeating William & Mary, 32–22.

The rivalry will likely go on hiatus after James Madison announced it would elevate its program to Division I FBS for the 2022 season, joining the Sun Belt Conference.

Game results

See also  
 List of NCAA college football rivalry games

References

College football rivalries in the United States
James Madison Dukes football
William & Mary Tribe football
1978 establishments in Virginia